Samuel Duggan (born 13 July 1998) is an English ice hockey player for Cardiff Devils and the British national team.

He represented Great Britain at the 2021 IIHF World Championship and 2022 IIHF World Championship.

References

External links

1998 births
Living people
British expatriate ice hockey people
Cardiff Devils players
Coventry Blaze players
English expatriate sportspeople in Sweden
English expatriate sportspeople in the United States
English ice hockey centres
English ice hockey right wingers
Expatriate ice hockey players in the United States
Sportspeople from Reading, Berkshire
Expatriate ice hockey players in Sweden